The Great Day is a 1920 British drama film directed by Hugh Ford. Alfred Hitchcock is credited as a title designer. On 17 April 1921, Paramount Pictures released the film in the US at five reels (roughly 50 minutes). The film is now considered to be a lost film.

Plot
As described in a film publication, Frank Beresford (Burleigh) and Clara Borstwick (Hume) have married against the wishes of her father, Sir John Borstwick (Bourchier). Immediately following the marriage, Lillian Leeson (Albanesi), to whom Frank had formerly been married, appears with the intent to blackmail. Frank had told Clara of the former marriage and had believed that Lillian was dead. Frank goes to Paris to find a former friend that he believed to be dead who was a former husband of Lillian. He recognizes Dave Leeson (Kerr) and they return to England. Dave frustrates the attempt by Lillian to spoil Frank's happiness, and there is a reconciliation with Clara.

Cast
 Arthur Bourchier as Sir John Borstwick
 Mary Palfrey as Lady Borstwick
 Marjorie Hume as Clara Borstwick
 Bertram Burleigh as Frank Beresford
 Adeline Hayden Coffin as Mrs. Beresford (as Mrs. Hayden Coffin)
 Percy Standing as Paul Nikola
 Meggie Albanesi as Lillian Leeson
 Geoffrey Kerr as Dave Leeson
 Lewis Dayton as Lord Medway

See also
 Alfred Hitchcock filmography
 List of lost films

References

External links
 

British drama films
British silent feature films
1920 films
1920 drama films
Lost British films
British black-and-white films
Films directed by Hugh Ford
1920 lost films
Lost drama films
1920s British films
Silent drama films